Taj al-Din Zangi was the Ghurid ruler of Sarakhs from c. 1200 to 1204/5.

Biography 
He was the son of the Ghurid ruler of Bamiyan, Fakhr al-Din Masud. Zangi also had a brother named Shams al-Din Muhammad ibn Masud. Zangi is first mentioned during the Ghurid conquest of western Khorasan, where he was appointed as the governor of Sarakhs, and was also given Abiward and Nasa as part of his domains. In 1201/2, the Khwarazm-shah Muhammad II invaded Khorasan, and besieged Sarakhs. However, Zangi managed to trick Muhammad II by pretending to leave the city to him, but then pillaged a Khwarazmian camp, where he managed to get supplies for his army and the city. The Ghurid prince Nasir al-Din Muhammad Kharnak shortly came to the aid of Zangi, and inflicted a heavy defeat on the Khwarazmians. In 1204/5, Zangi was killed by the Khwarmazians near Sarakhs.

References

Sources 

 
 

13th-century Iranian people
12th-century Iranian people
Ghurid dynasty
13th-century deaths
12th-century births